South Fork State Recreation Area is a state park unit of the state of Nevada covering nearly four thousand acres, located  due south of Elko. The park comprises the  South Fork Reservoir and surrounding marsh, meadowlands, and hills.

History
The land was formerly the site of the Tomera Ranch, which was sold to the state in 1983. The reservoir was created with construction of the South Fork Dam, an impoundment on the South Fork of the Humboldt River authorized in 1983 and completed in 1988. Filling of the reservoir was completed in 1995.

Activities and amenities
Facilities include a 25-site campground, boat ramp, and parking area near the dam. The reservoir is known for its trophy-class trout and bass fishing. South Fork Canyon, managed by the Bureau of Land Management below the dam, is available for hiking, floating, and fishing.

References

External links

South Fork State Recreation Area Nevada State Parks
South Fork State Recreation Area Trail Map Nevada State Parks

State parks of Nevada
Protected areas of Elko County, Nevada
Protected areas established in 1983
1983 establishments in Nevada
Reservoirs in Nevada